Sadakatsiz is a Turkish psychological thriller television series produced by Med Yapım. It is an adaptation of the British television series Doctor Foster, starring Cansu Dere, Caner Cindoruk, and Melis Sezen. The first episode was aired on 7 October 2020 and was directed by Neslihan Yeşilyurt. The script was written by the Kemal Hamamcıoğlu and Dilara Pamuk duo in the first season and by the Arzu Daştan Mutlu, Mustafa Mutlu, Gamze Arslan and Nuriye Bilici quartet since the second season. The series ended with its 60th episode aired on 25 May 2022.

Plot 
Doctor Asya (Cansu Dere) lives a peaceful and happy life with her husband Volkan (Caner Cindoruk) and their son Ali (Alp Akar). This situation changes when she finds out that her husband has been having an affair with a young woman named Derin (Melis Sezen) for two years. Asya must choose between saving her marriage and taking revenge on her unfaithful husband.

Cast 
 Cansu Dere as Asya Yılmaz
 Caner Cindoruk as Volkan Arslan
 Melis Sezen as Derin Güçlü
 Özge Özder as Derya Samanlı 
 Gözde Seda Altuner as Gönül Güçlü
 Nazlı Bulum as Nil Tetik
 Taro Emir Tekin as Selçuk Dağcı
 Alp Akar as Ali Arslan
 Meltem Baytok as Cavidan
 Zerrin Nişancı as Nevin
 Doğan Can Sarıkaya as Demir Güçlü
 Yaren Vera Salma as Zeynep Arslan
 Gamze Büyükbaşoğlu as Pelin
 Berkay Ateş as Aras Ateşoğlu
 Aslı Orcan as Leyla Ateşoğlu
 Burak Sergen as Haluk Güçlü
 Yeliz Kuvancı as Bahar Erginer
 Ali İl as Melih Erginer
 Mahmut Gökgöz as Altan Saygıner
 Kenan Ece as Turgay Güngör
 Aydan Taş as Didem Aktaş
 Bennu Yıldırımlar as Asya Günalan
 Onur Berk Arslanoğlu as Faruk Günçay
 Name Önal as Nazan Günçay
 Melisa Döngel as Hicran Dağcı
 Cemal Hünal as Sinan Taşkıran
 Olcay Yusufoğlu as Serap Şenlik 
 Eren Vurdem as Mert Gelik
 Dora Dalgıç as Selen
 Ceren Çiçek as İpek

References

External links 
 Sadakatsiz on Twitter
 Sadakatsiz on Instagram

2020 Turkish television series debuts
Doctor Foster
Kanal D original programming
Turkish drama television series
Turkish television series
Turkish television series based on British television series